Bertil T. Rosander (March 6, 1912 – September 6, 2000) was an American businessman and politician.

Rosander was born in Sweden, and went to the Rockford public schools. He received his bachelor's degree from the University of Illinois and was involved in the accounting business. He served on the Rockford City Council in 1955 and 1959. Rosander was a Republican. He served in the Illinois House of Representatives from 1961 to 1965 and in the Illinois Senate from 1965 to 1973.

Notes

1912 births
2000 deaths
Businesspeople from Illinois
Politicians from Rockford, Illinois
University of Illinois alumni
Illinois city council members
Republican Party members of the Illinois House of Representatives
Republican Party Illinois state senators